Máire is the debut album by Irish musician Máire Brennan, released in 1992.

Recordings were made at:
Castle Sound Studio, Pentcaitland – (Engineer Calum Malcolm)
Metropolis, London

Track listing
"Cé Leis" – 4:05
"Against the Wind" – 5:34
"Oró" – 3:59
"Voices of the Land" – 3:23
"Jealous Heart" – 4:37
"Land of Youth (Tir na nÓg)" – 5:53
"I Believe (Deep Within)" – 3:57
"Beating Heart" – 4:16
"No Easy Way" – 5:24
"Atlantic Shore" – 4:02

Personnel

Band
Máire Brennan – Vocals, Harp, Piano, Keyboards
Deirdre Brennan – Vocals
Brídín Brennan – Vocals
Calum Malcolm – Keyboards
Dónal Lunny – Bodhrán, Bouzouki, electric Bouzouki, Mandolin, Keyboards
Nigel Thomas – Drums, Percussion
Nigel Clarke – Acoustic Guitar
Alex Poots – Flugel Horn
Richie Buckley – Soprano Saxophone
Mick Taylor – Tin Whistle, Chinese Flute

Commercial singles
"Against the Wind"
"Jealous Heart"

Promotional singles
"Beating Heart"

Release details
1992, UK, BMG Records PL 75358, Release Date ? June 1992, Vinyl LP 
1992, UK, BMG Records PD 75358, Release Date ? June 1992, CD 
1992, UK, BMG Records PK 75358, Release Date ? June 1992, Cassette
1992, USA, Atlantic Records 7 82421-2, Release Date 15 September 1992, CD
1992, Japan, BMG Records BVCP 214, Release Date ? June 1992, CD
1992, Taiwan, BMG Records PK 75358, Release Date ? June 1992, Cassette
199?, UK, BMG Records 7432 122821 2, Release Date ? ? 199?, CD

External links
 This album at Northern Skyline

Moya Brennan albums
1992 debut albums
Atlantic Records albums